Aftab Uddin Sarkar is a Bangladesh Awami League politician and the incumbent Member of Parliament from Nilphamari-1.

Career
Sarkar was involved in the 1969 student movement and was a former Member of Mukti Bahini during Bangladesh Liberation war. He is the President of Dimla Upazila unit of Bangladesh Awami League. He was elected to Parliament from Nilphamari-1 on 5 January 2014 as a candidate of Bangladesh Awami League. He is a Member of Parliamentary Standing Committee on Ministry of Civil Aviation and Tourism.

References

Awami League politicians
Living people
10th Jatiya Sangsad members
Mukti Bahini personnel
11th Jatiya Sangsad members
Year of birth missing (living people)